Babak Dehghanpisheh is a Senior Reporter with Reuters covering the Middle East. He was formerly Newsweek magazine's Baghdad Bureau Chief and Beirut Bureau Chief and covered Syria for The Washington Post.  In Iraq, Dehghanpisheh reported on events ranging from Saddam Hussein's capture to the rise of Shiite clerics and Iraq's first elections. He was embedded with one of the first Marine units that invaded Falluja in late 2004 and was also one of the few journalists who got inside Abu Ghraib prison shortly after the scandal broke.

Before going to Iraq, Dehghanpisheh reported extensively on America's war on terror. He was one block away from the north tower of the World Trade Center when it collapsed and was dispatched to Afghanistan a few weeks later. He spent the next year reporting from Afghanistan and Pakistan, tracing the steps of Al Qaeda fighters in Tora Bora and following the development of the new Afghan government.
 
In the past six years, Dehghanpisheh has frequently reported from Iran and he co-authored a cover-length profile of Iranian president Mahmoud Ahmadinejad. Dehghanpisheh has also reported from Syria, Egypt, Jordan and Lebanon, where he filed from the front lines with Hezbollah guerrillas during the war with Israel in summer 2006.

Dehghanpisheh has won numerous awards for his reportage. In 2014, he shared the Gerald Loeb Award for Explanatory business journalism.

In 2003 he was a finalist for the Livingston Award for Young Journalists for his Iraq coverage.

In the fall of 2002, Dehghanpisheh was the lead reporter for "The War Crimes of Afghanistan," which won a National Headliner Award and was a finalist for the National Magazine Award for public service.

Dehghanpisheh also won the Society of Publishers in Asia's Young Journalist Award in 2003 for his Afghanistan coverage.

Dehghanpisheh first worked for Newsweek as a freelancer in the Johannesburg bureau of the magazine. He returned to Newsweek as an intern in the New York City bureau in the summer of 2001. Since then, he has worked on more than 25 Newsweek cover stories. Dehghanpisheh also contributed to the war coverage which garnered Newsweek a 2004 National Magazine Award for General Excellence. He has appeared regularly on CNN, MSNBC, Fox and NPR.

Dehghanpisheh, born to an Iranian father and American mother, has a bachelor's degree in business and an M.M.C. in journalism from Arizona State University. He has been awarded a Knight Fellowship at Stanford University for the year 2008–2009.

In 2014, he received the Investigative Reporting Award from the European Press Prize alongside Steve Stecklow and Yaganeh Torbati for their investigative report "Assets of the Ayatollah", published by Reuters.

References
 Newsweek bio
 Stanford bio

Newsweek people
Living people
Gerald Loeb Award winners for Explanatory
Year of birth missing (living people)
European Press Prize winners